The NOS Primavera Sound 2022 was held on 9 to 11 June 2022 at the Parque da Cidade, Porto, Portugal. The festival was headlined by Tame Impala, Nick Cave and the Bad Seeds, Pavement, Beck and Gorillaz.

Lineup
Headline performers are listed in boldface. Artists listed from latest to earliest set times.

{{hidden
| headercss = color:#ffffff; background: #1a76a0; font-size: 100%; width: 100%;;
| contentcss = text-align: left; font-size: 100%; width: 100%;;
| header = Headlining set lists
| content =
{{hidden
| headercss = color:#ffffff; background: #1a76a0; font-size: 100%; width: 100%;;
| contentcss = text-align: left; font-size: 100%; width: 100%;;
| header = Tame Impala
| content =

"One More Year"
"Borderline"
"Nangs"
"Mind Mischief"
"Breathe Deeper"
"Elephant"
"Lost in Yesterday"
"Apocalypse Dreams"
"Let It Happen"
"Feels Like We Only Go Backwards"
"Eventually"
"Runway, Houses, City, Clouds"

Encore
"The Less I Know the Better"
"New Person, Same Old Mistakes"
}}
{{hidden
| headercss = color:#ffffff; background: #1a76a0; font-size: 100%; width: 100%;;
| contentcss = text-align: left; font-size: 100%; width: 100%;;
| header = Nick Cave & the Bad Seeds
| content =

"Get Ready for Love"
"There She Goes, My Beautiful World"
"From Her to Eternity"
"O Children"
"Jubilee Street"
"Bright Horses"
"I Need You"
"Waiting for You"
"Carnage"
"Tupelo"
"Red Right Hand"
"The Mercy Seat"
"The Ship Song"
"Higgs Boson Blues"
"City of Refuge"
"White Elephant"

Encore
"Into My Arms"
"Vortex"
"Ghosteen Speaks"
}}

}}

References

External links

2022 music festivals
Music festivals in Portugal
Primavera Sound